The 2003 World Junior Curling Championships were held at the Die Alpenarena in Flims, Switzerland March 22–30. Teams from the province of Saskatchewan won gold medals in both events for Canada. It would be the last women's championship won by Canada until 2014.

Men's

Playoffs

Women's

Tie breaker

Playoffs

Semi-finals

Bronze Game

Final

Sources

Junior
2003
International curling competitions hosted by Switzerland
International sports competitions hosted by Switzerland
2003 in Swiss sport
Flims
March 2003 sports events in Europe
2003 in youth sport